, also known as Inspector Imanishi Investigates, is mystery novel written by Seichō Matsumoto.  Suna no Utsuwa was originally serialized as a serial in the Japanese newspaper Yomiuri Shimbun between 1960 to 1961 and was published from Kobunsha in 1961.  The novel has been made into a film and TV dramas.

Adaptations
 Castle of Sand (1974), a Shochiku production, directed by Yoshitarō Nomura and starring Tetsurō Tamba.
 Suna no Utsuwa  (1977), a Fuji TV production, mini-series in 6 episodes. directed by Takuji Tominaga. It stars Tatsuya Nakadai (Eitaro Imanishi) and Masakazu Tamura ( Eiryo Waga). 
 Suna no Utsuwa (2004), a TBS production, starring Masahiro Nakai as Eiryo Waga and Ken Watanabe as Eitaro Imanishi.

References

1961 Japanese novels
Japanese novels
Japanese crime novels
Japanese novels adapted into films
1970s drama television series